Mohammed al-Dairi  or Mohammed ad-Dairi  (born 7 March 1952) is a Libyan politician. He was the foreign minister of Libya from the Tobruk-based House of Representatives since 28 September 2014 until 28 February 2019.

He graduated in Law faculty at the University of Grenoble, and got a master's degree in law from the same university. He is a diplomat since.

He has worked in several diplomatic missions, including appointing a diplomatic attaché to the mission of the League of Arab States accredited to the United Nations in Geneva.

See also
List of foreign ministers in 2017
List of current foreign ministers

References 

Living people
Grenoble Alpes University alumni
Foreign ministers of Libya
1952 births